Amulree is a community in the township of Perth East, Perth County, Ontario, Canada. Silver Creek runs past the community. The settlement was named after the hamlet of Amulree in Perthshire, Scotland, and a number of its early settlers were from Perthshire.

See also

 List of unincorporated communities in Ontario

References

Communities in Perth County, Ontario